Mosby Creek is a  tributary of the Row River in Lane County, in the U.S. state of Oregon. It begins at the confluence of the east and west forks of the creek near the Calapooia Divide and the border with Douglas County.

Mosby Creek was named for David Mosby, an early settler. He lived near the mouth of the stream, once known as Brumbaugh Creek.

Built in 1920, it is the oldest covered bridge in Lane County.

Further upstream near Walden, the Stewart Covered Bridge carries Garoutte Road over the creek. Built in 1930 and restored in 1996, this  span is used only for pedestrian and bicycle traffic.

Tributaries
Mosby Creek's east and west forks meet to form the main stem. Named tributaries from source to mouth include Cove, Tom, Miles, Tones, Lilly, Brownie, and Shea creeks. Then come Gray, Norwegian, Dahl, Little Dry, Dry, Bark Shanty, and Stell creeks, followed by Allen, Cedar, Clearing, Cow, Palmer, Rock, and Lewis creeks. Below that are Simpson, Blue, Short, Fall, Kennedy, Smith, Perkins, Kizer, and Champion creeks.

See also
List of covered bridges in Oregon
List of rivers of Oregon

References

Rivers of Lane County, Oregon
Rivers of Oregon